Denise Poirier is an American actress. She is best known for playing the character of Æon Flux in the MTV animated series of the same name.

She also had prominent roles in Reign: The Conqueror, HBO's Spawn, and the 1998 Urban Vision Entertainment dub of Golgo 13: Queen Bee, the Vampire Hunter D video game, as well as guest appearances on Seinfeld, Frasier, Murphy Brown, and 3rd Rock from the Sun.

In 2010, she portrayed the villain Verloona Ti in the AudioComics Company recording of the space opera "Starstruck". The recording was made available as a double CD and as MP3 downloads. In 2011, she reprised the role in a new audioplay, "Starstruck: Running Scared", which was scheduled for release as a free download later in the year.

Filmography

Film

Television

Video games

References

 
 Resumé page at New England Casting
 Resumé page at New England Film

American film actresses
American television actresses
American video game actresses
American voice actresses
Living people
20th-century American actresses
21st-century American actresses
Place of birth missing (living people)
Year of birth missing (living people)